Paulina Guz (born 12 July 1991) is a road cyclist from Poland. She became national road race champion in 2014.

References

External links
 profile at Procyclingstats.com

1991 births
Polish female cyclists
Living people
Place of birth missing (living people)
Cyclists at the 2015 European Games
European Games competitors for Poland